Abraham "Old Abe" Warner (circa 1814-1896) was an eccentric shop owner in the nineteenth century, in New York and San Francisco.
Abraham Warner was fond of children, animals, art, and his collection of various items. He was superstitious about or perhaps admired spiders, as he refused to kill them or to disrupt their webs. He however kept himself tidy and well groomed. The most commonly ordered drink at his bar was a gin and whisky hot toddy with cloves, but he refused to sell whisky straight. He made free chowder and sold locally made French bread alongside French and Spanish drinks, and seafood.

Life
Abe Warner was born in New York City, New York, between 1814 and 1817. He was first employed as a butcher in Fulton Market, an later, in 1849, on San Francisco's Long Wharf. It was during this job that he gained his notable top hat. In 1856, Warner bought a restaurant at the foot of Meiggs Wharf and renamed it the Cobweb Palace. He sold the Palace in an auction in 1893 and died in 1896. His bedroom upon death contained a cockatoo which had died days before, a Louis XIV bed, and a younger portrait of himself.

See also
Meiggs Wharf
The Cobweb Palace

References
Abe Warner the Cobweb King. SFGate.com

Businesspeople from the San Francisco Bay Area
1810s births
1896 deaths
19th-century American businesspeople